Global Industrial & Defence Solutions (GIDS) is a Pakistani state-owned defence conglomerate, and the country's largest defence manufacturer, offering products for military applications. Customers include the Pakistan Armed Forces.

GIDS' product portfolio comprises offerings in the domains of air, land, aea, nuclear, biological and chemical defence and security.

GIDS is also Pakistan's largest state-owned manufacturer of unmanned aerial vehicles (UAVs), offering medium range tactical UAVs and short-range, hand-launched and VTOL systems.

Established in 2007, GIDS is based in Rawalpindi, Pakistan. According to Janes Information Services, it is "Pakistan’s largest state-owned manufacturer of unmanned aerial vehicles". GIDS frequently exhibits its products at arms expositions in the Middle East and Africa. Its CEO is Mr. Asad Kamal

GIDS exports Pakistani defence manufacturing products to international markets and acts as "the means to help vertically integrate customers across Pakistan’s wider defence industry". It manufactures products such as the "Range Extension Kit (REK)" for Mark 80 series general-purpose bombs.

GIDS also make parts for Pakistan Army's main battle tanks, such as Integrated Battlefield Management Systems. In 2015, Foreign Affairs reported that GIDS demonstrated reconnaissance drones at arms fairs in Islamabad. They also manufacture ballistic helmets, bulletproof vests and kneepads for the armed forces of Pakistan.

Products

UAVs: Shahpar UAV, Shahpar-II UAV, Uqab UAV, HUMA UAV
 Guided missiles: Baktar-Shikan (ATGM), Anza (MANPADS)
 Guided bombs: Takbir, Range Extension Kit (REK) for Mark 80 series general-purpose bombs
 Unguided bombs: GP Series Bombs (steel and pre-fragmented), Sea-Surge (Anti-submarine depth charge)
 Grenades: stun grenades, smoke grenades, tear gas grenades
 Electronics and electro-optics: MOHAFIZ (chaff and flare dispenser system for protection of aircraft against guided missiles), Rehbar Pak-IBMS (Integrated Battle Management System), C4I and navigation systems, electronic warfare systems, observation and surveillance systems, automated fire control systems, laser rangefinders and sensors, sonar and acoustic systems, simulators and training systems
 Other: ballistic helmets, bulletproof jackets, security detectors and scanners, Nuclear, biological and chemical defence suits and protective equipment, HEADS (High Efficiency Advanced Decontamination System), armoured naval boats

See also
NESCOM

References

Aerospace companies of Pakistan
Defence companies of Pakistan
Manufacturing companies of Pakistan
Weapons trade
Companies based in Rawalpindi
Unmanned aerial vehicle manufacturers of Pakistan